Sringapuram Mahadeva Temple is a Shiva Temple, (Malayalam: ശൃംഗപുരം മഹാദേവക്ഷേത്രം), is located at Kodungallur in Thrissur District of Kerala. The temple adjoins the Kodungallur Kovilakam Palace. The presiding deity of the temple is Shiva.

References

Shiva temples in Kerala
Hindu temples in Thrissur district
108 Shiva Temples